Wabanag is a Canadian-Finnish-Irish ethnic rock band based in Helsinki, Finland.

History

Wabanag is a Canadian-Finnish ethnic rock band based in Helsinki, Finland. The Band was founded and formed by singer/songwriter Yovan Nagwetch in the early 1990s after he emigrated to Finland, after spending many years performing and travelling elsewhere in Europe, most notably in France. Early members included Esu Holopainen and Aleksi Lausti. Nagwetch is a Canadian Wabanaki Métis from Quebec. The homeland of the Wabanaki Métis consists of the eastern region of the North American continent, generally described as being New England in the United States, plus Quebec and the Maritimes in Canada. Their history dates back to the sixteenth century when the first Europeans, mainly French, married within local tribes and adopted the “Indian” way of life.

After arriving in Finland Nagwetch started to explore the musical heritage of his Wabanaki ancestors resulting in the creation of Wabanag, a concept band gathering young musicians of different ethnic backgrounds and playing Nagwetch's music.

Wabanag was nominated for Best International Album at the Canadian Aboriginal Music Awards in 2005 for their album Ulodi, for blending traditional native music and contemporary styles.

In the music of Wabanag, hand drums, rattles, bows, wooden sticks, flutes, and other traditional instruments are used sparingly along with vocals and strong rhythmic lines (bass, drums, guitars). Most of the songs are in Native American languages and refer to the natural elements and the spiritual world of the native people from the Maritimes, as well as to their traditional way of life.

At present Wabanag is active and touring.

Members

 Yovan Nagwetch : Lead singer, flute, frame drum
 Juha Jokiranta : Guitar
 Iivo Baric : Bass
 Jussi Nikula : Drums

Former members
 Dáithí O'Cléirigh : Acoustic Drums and Various Percussion
 Esu Holopainen : Percussion, Guitar
 Jani Takkunen : Drums and percussion
 Aleksi Lausti : Bass Guitar

Discography

Ulodi (2004)
Ulodi – 1:41
Yabadjasit Uskidjinudi – 3:10
Djonetch – 4:31
Welalin – 4:20
Apkwallnuagi – 5:21
Niskamiktuk – 6:54
Ntelnuegadimka – 3:56
Dla`hadigetch – 3:59
Melkigenan – 6:47
Amitola – 2:54
Konawa – 4:38
Ulodi – 0:55

References

External links
 Official WebsiteMyspaceFinnish-Canadian Society_NagwetchCanadian Aboriginal Music Awards

Finnish musical groups